The Russell Brand Show is the name of several works:
 The Russell Brand Show (radio show), a radio show and podcast
 The Russell Brand Show (TV series), a television show